Villy Sørensen (13 January 1929 – 16 December 2001) was a Danish short story writer, philosopher and literary critic of the Modernist tradition. His fiction was heavily influenced by his philosophical ideas, and he has been compared to Franz Kafka in this regard.

History 
Born in Copenhagen, Sørensen graduated from the Vestre Borgerdydskole in 1947, and then attended the University of Copenhagen and the University of Freiburg studying philosophy. Although he did not graduate, he later received an honorary degree from the University of Copenhagen.

Sørensen published his first collection of short stories, Strange Stories in 1953, which many critics have identified as being the start of Danish literary Modernism. He published additional collections of short stories in 1955 and 1964, all winning various awards in Denmark. These stories generally explored the absurd and hidden parts of the human psyche.

Sørensen began editing the journal Vindrosen (with Klaus Rifbjerg) in 1959. Afterward, he became a member of the Danish Academy in 1965, subsequently editing several other Modernist journals and periodicals. Sørensen, though he continued to produce short fiction throughout his life, was also deeply engaged in philosophy, about which he wrote many essays and several books including Seneca: The Humanist at the Court of Nero and his response to Søren Kierkegaard's Either/Or, Hverken-eller (i.e. "Neither/Nor"). He also published books and essays about Nietzsche, Kafka, Marx, Schopenhauer and Kierkegaard, and was a notable translator of over 20 books. He was awarded the Grand Prize of the Danish Academy in 1962, The Nordic Council's Literature Prize in 1974, the Hans Christian Andersen Award in 1983, the inaugural Swedish Academy Nordic Prize in 1986, along with many other awards and recognitions. He died in Copenhagen in 2001.

Bibliography 
 Sære historier, 1953 - Strange Stories / Tiger in the Kitchen and Other Strange Stories
 Ufarlige historier, 1955 - Harmless Tales
 Tiger in the Kitchen and Other Strange Stories, 1957
 Digtere og dæmoner: Fortolkninger og vurderinger, 1959
 ed.: Begrebet Angest by Søren Kierkegaard, 1960
 Hverken-eller: Kritiske betragtningen, 1961
 ed.: Økonomi og filosofi by Karl Marx, 1962
 Nietzsche, 1963
 Formynderfortællinger, 1964 - Tutelary Tales
 ed.: Haabløse Slægter by Herman Bang, 1965
 ed.: Eventyr og historier by H.C. Andersen, 1965
 ed.: Skuespil by William Shakespeare, 1966
 Kafkas digtning, 1968
 Schopenhauer, 1969
 Mellem fortid og fremtid, 1969
 Midler uden mål. 1971
 Uden mål - og med, moralske tanker, 1973
 Seneca, 1976 - Seneca: The Humanist at the Court of Nero
 translator: The Book by Martin A. Hansen, 1978 (with Anne Born)
 Oprør fra midten, 1978 (with Niels I Meyer and K. Helweg-Pedersen) - Revolt from the Center
 Den gyldne middelvej, og andre debatindlæg i 1970erne, 1979
 Vejrdage, betragtninger 1980
 translator: The Dream of the Woman by Knud Hjortø, 1980 (with Anne Born)
 Alladin, 1981 (with Errol le Cain)
 Ragnarok, en gudefortælling, 1982 - The Downfall of the Gods - Ragnarök, jumalten tuho
 Røret om oprøret, 1982 (with Niels I Meyer and K. Helweg-Pedersen)
 translator: The Mountains by H.C. Branner (with Anne Born)
 ed.: Kunsten og revolutionen by Richard Wagner, 1983
 En gudedrøm, ballet for Nyt Danske Danseteater, 1984
 translation: Skøn er krigen for den uerfarne (Dulce bellum inexpertis) by Erasmus Roterodamus, 1984
 De mange og De enkelte og andre småhistorier, 1986
 ed.: Tine by Herman Bang, 1986
 ed.: Tunge Melodier by Herman Bang, 1987
 ed.: Enten-Eller by Søren Kierkegaard, 1988
 Demokratiet og kunsten, 1988
 Tilløb: dagbog 1949-53, 1988
 Den berømte Odysseus, 1988 (with Andy Li Jørgensen)
 Apollons oprør: de udødeliges historie, 1989
 Another Metamorphosis & Other Fictions, 1990, translated by Tiina Nunnally & Steven T. Murray
 Forløb: dagbog 1953-61, 1990
 ed.: Demokratiske visioner by Walt Whitman, 1991
 Den frie vilje, 1992
 Jesus og Kristus, 1992
 Perioder: dagbog 1961-74, 1993
 Historien om Ødipus, 1995 (with Roald Als)
 translation: Grimms eventyr, 1995
 Blot en drengestreg, 1996 (with Pernille Kløvedal Helweg)
 translation: Drømme by Franz Kafka, 1998
 Jesus og Kristus, 1999
 På egne veje, 2000
 En ensom fugl, 2000

Sources
 
 "Sorensen, Villy." Encyclopædia Britannica Online. Retrieved 31 October 2006.

1929 births
2001 deaths
Danish essayists
Danish literary critics
Danish male short story writers
Nordic Council Literature Prize winners
People from Copenhagen
Recipients of the Grand Prize of the Danish Academy
20th-century Danish writers
20th-century Danish short story writers
20th-century essayists
20th-century Danish male writers